The 2003 French motorcycle Grand Prix was the fourth round of the 2003 MotoGP Championship. It took place on the weekend of 23–25 May 2003 at the Bugatti Circuit located in Le Mans, France.

MotoGP classification
The race was stopped after 15 laps due to rain. It was later restarted for 13 laps with the grid order determined by the running order after the suspension. The second part of the race determined the final result.

250 cc classification

125 cc classification

Championship standings after the race (motoGP)

Below are the standings for the top five riders and constructors after round four has concluded.

Riders' Championship standings

Constructors' Championship standings

 Note: Only the top five positions are included for both sets of standings.

References

French motorcycle Grand Prix
French
Motorcycle Grand Prix